Geligerd (also Romanized as Gelīgerd, Gelījerd, Golicherd, and Golī Jerd; also known as Gol Gerd and Jīlkerd) is a village in Japelaq-e Sharqi Rural District, Japelaq District, Azna County, Lorestan Province, Iran. At the 2006 census, its population was 613, in 159 families.

References 

Towns and villages in Azna County